The 2016 São Paulo Challenger de Tênis was a professional tennis tournament played on clay courts. It was the sixth edition of the tournament which was part of the 2016 ATP Challenger Tour. It took place in São Paulo, Brazil between 18 and 24 April 2016.

Singles main-draw entrants

Seeds

 1 Rankings as of 11 April 2016.

Other entrants
The following players received wildcards into the singles main draw:
  Gabriel Décamps
  Rafael Camilo
  Wilson Leite
  Felipe Meligeni Alves

The following players received entry from the qualifying draw:
  João Pedro Sorgi
  Ricardo Hocevar
  André Miele
  Alexandre Tsuchiya

Champions

Singles

  Gonzalo Lama def.  Ernesto Escobedo, 6–2, 6–2

Doubles

  Fabrício Neis /  Caio Zampieri def.  José Pereira /  Alexandre Tsuchiya, 6–4, 7–6(7–3)

External links
Official Website

Sao Paulo Challenger de Tenis
São Paulo Challenger de Tênis